Paul Bracq (born December 13, 1933, Bordeaux, France) is an automotive designer noted for his work at Mercedes-Benz, BMW, Citroën, and Peugeot.

Career
Bracq's career began in the design studio of Philippe Charbonneaux, serving as his assistant in 1953 and 1954.  During this period, the studio produced the designs for the French Presidential limousine built by Citroën, a one-off Pegaso coupe, and other automobiles.

Bracq served his mandatory military service from late 1954 through 1957. Subsequently, he worked for Daimler-Benz, heading its design studio in Sindelfingen, a post he held for ten years.  Bracq styled the Mercedes 600, 230SL/250SL/280SL roadster, the 220S coupé, the 250 and 220D, the W108 and W114 coupe series, and its stablemate the W115 – all of the '60s and '70s.
 
Upon his return to France in 1967, Bracq worked for Brissonneau and Lotz, where he worked on the design of the TGV high-speed passenger train led by Jacques Cooper.  During this time, Bracq was also responsible for prototypes of a sports car based on the BMW 1600Ti and a coupé based on the Simca 1100.

In 1970, Bracq was appointed design director of BMW, where he succeeded Wilhelm Hofmeister ao. E9 series. Bracq was responsible for the initial designs of the BMW E12 5 Series BMW E21 3 series, E24 6 series and the E23 7 Series.  His 1973 "Turbo" concept car won "Concept Car of the Year" by the Revue Automobile Suisse that year; the car repeated the feat in 1992 in the Bagatelle Concours d'Elegance.

Braque began with Peugeot in 1974, going on to design personal transportation for the Pope and the interiors of the Peugeot 604 and the 505.

Bracq is also active as a judge in many automotive concours, including the Pebble Beach Concours d'Elegance.

References

External links
Timeline of Paul Bracq's career
BMW Designers, an overview of automotive designers working for BMW

1933 births
Living people
People from Bordeaux
French artists
French automobile designers
BMW designers